Paul Benoit (January 14, 1850 – November 19, 1915) was a French born Roman Catholic priest of the Canons Regular of the Immaculate Conception.

He was baptized Joseph Paul Augustine.

In 1874 he completed a doctorate in theology at the College of St. Thomas in Rome, the future Pontifical University of St. Thomas Aquinas, Angelicum

References

External links
 Biography at the Dictionary of Canadian Biography Online

1850 births
1915 deaths
20th-century Canadian Roman Catholic priests
Pontifical University of Saint Thomas Aquinas alumni
19th-century Canadian Roman Catholic priests